Trachtenberg (Russian/Ukrainian: Трахтенберг, ; , is a surname of several notable people, typically an Ashkenazi Jewish surname, especially Bessarabian and Ukrainian. Sometimes the name is transliterated to Trachtenburg, whilst Jews from Argentina often spell the name Trajtenberg according to Spanish spelling norms. Some more recent immigrants from the former Soviet Union have had the name transliterated as Trakhtenberg when entering the US.

Trachtenberg, literally "a mountain of costumes" (in German), or "a mountain of thoughts" (in Yiddish), is actually the former German name of a town in Silesia now called by the Polish name Żmigród, where Jews were a significant part of the population until the Second World War and the Holocaust. Jews who bear this name are usually descendants of families who moved from Trachtenburg, Silesia, to another place in central or eastern Europe (and then elsewhere, later on), and became known in their new communities by their former place of residence.

List of people with the surname Trachtenberg 

 Alan Trachtenberg (1932–2020), scholar of American Studies
 Alexander Trachtenberg (1884–1966), Marxist founder of International Publishers (NYC)
 Dan Trachtenberg (born 1981), American director
 Deborah Trachtenberg, American journalist and television personality
 Herman Trachtenberg (1839–1895), Ukrainian-Jewish jurist
 Isaac Trachtenberg (1923–2023), Ukrainian hygienist and professor
 Jakow Trachtenberg (1888–1953), Ukrainian-Jewish inventor of the Trachtenberg system of rapid mental arithmetic
 Joshua Trachtenberg (1904–1959), American rabbi and scholar of Jewish history
 Marc Trachtenberg (born 1946), American historian
 Michelle Trachtenberg (born 1985), American actress
 Stephen Joel Trachtenberg (born 1937), former president of George Washington University

List of people with alternative spellings  
 Jason Trachtenburg, American musician
 Rachel Trachtenburg (born 1993), American musician
 Tina Trachtenburg, better known as Mother Pigeon, American street performance artist
 Manuel Trajtenberg (born 1950), Israeli economist
 Paul Tractenberg, American law professor and legal advocate for educational rights

References

Surnames
Jewish surnames
Lower Silesian Voivodeship
Yiddish-language surnames